ABC North Coast is an ABC Local Radio station based in Lismore and broadcasting to the Northern Rivers region in New South Wales. This includes the towns and cities of Grafton, Ballina, Casino and Murwillumbah.

The station began as 2NR in 1936 originally based in Grafton, moving to Lismore in 1989. It is heard on these main AM and FM frequencies:

2NR 738 AM (Grafton and Clarence Valley)
2ML 720 AM (Tweed Valley)
2NNR 94.5 FM (Richmond and the Tweed)

The station airs locally focused programming from 6 am to 11 am. At all other times, it airs programming relayed from ABC Radio Sydney, or regional programming that airs on all provincial Local Radio stations.

See also
 List of radio stations in Australia

References

North Coast
Radio stations in New South Wales
Radio stations established in 1936
1936 establishments in Australia